Audea tachosoides is a moth of the family Erebidae first described by Lars Kühne in 2005. It is found in Burkina Faso and Ivory Coast.

References

Moths described in 2005
Audea
Moths of Africa